Uttarpara Amarendra Vidyapith which was established on 6 March 1939, is an institution located in Uttarpara, West Bengal in India.  The institution is named after the freedom fighter late Shri Amarendra Nath Chattopadhyay, who was a resident of Uttarpara.

Uttarpara Amarendra Vidyapith follows the curricula of West Bengal Board of Secondary Education (W.B.B.S.E.) and West Bengal Council of Higher Secondary Education (W.B.C.H.S.E.) for Madhyamik and Higher Secondary respectively. It is a Bengali medium school for boys, having a student strength of 1500.

Students from surrounding localities such as Hindmotor, Bally, Belur, Liluah, Ariadaha, Serampore, and Dankuni enroll here. The institute hosts a three-day-long educational exhibition every year during Saraswati Puja.

References

Boys' schools in India
Primary schools in West Bengal
High schools and secondary schools in West Bengal
Schools in Hooghly district
Educational institutions established in 1939
1939 establishments in India